Veliko Orašje  is a village in the municipality of Velika Plana, Serbia. According to the 2002 census, the village has a population of 2299 people.

History
From 1869 to 1947 Veliko Orašje was the seat of a district in the Jasenica region, which was then reformed into Velika Plana Municipality and its seat moved to Velika Plana. 

From 1929 to 1941, it was part of the Danube Banovina of the Kingdom of Yugoslavia.

References

Populated places in Podunavlje District